Hypericum formosissimum is a species of flowering plant in the family Hypericaceae, section Adenosepalum, in the Hypericum huber-morathii group.

Taxonomy
Hypericum formosissimum was first described in Zametki Sist. Geogr. Rast. (Notes on Systematics and Geography of Plants) in 1940 by Armen Takhtajan. The species was actually omitted by error from Norman Robson's comprehensive monograph of the genus Hypericum in 1981 but was later accepted as a valid species of the genus. The species is an extreme development of Adenosepalum and is confined to limestone rocks, a behavior shared with the other members of the huber-morathii group.

Description
It is glabrous (lacks hairs) and has numerous stems that are straggling and almost grow along the ground. The stems are slender, terete, brittle, and lack glands. The leaves have 2 lateral pairs of veins that ascend from the lower portion of the midrib and are difficult to see. The glands on the leaves are pale and dense and the intramarginal glands are black and spaced out. The species is 1-5 flowered from terminal nodes without any flowering branches below. The pedicels that hold the flowers are long. The bracts are small and are black and denticulate. The petals are a pale yellow and are 8 by 5 millimeters in size.

The species flowers from June–July and fruits from July–August.

Distribution and habitat
The species is native to Turkey in central Anatolia as well as the Transcaucasus region, especially in Armenia and Azerbaijan.

Ecology
H. formosissimum is an endangered species that occupies an area of less than 500 square kilometers. It was included in the Red Data Book of Armenia as a Rare Species (Category 2).

Chemistry
Unlike other species in sect. Adenosepalum, H. formosissimum does not contain hypericin and pseudohypericin, but only pseudohypericin. The species contains about 0.05% content pseudohypericin.

References

formosissimum
Flora of Asia
Plants described in 1940